James B. Renacci (born December 3, 1958) is an American accountant, businessman, and politician who served as the U.S. representative for  from 2011 to 2019. A member of the Republican Party, he is a former city council president and two-term Mayor of Wadsworth, Ohio. In 2018, Renacci was the unsuccessful Republican nominee for the U.S. Senate, losing to Democratic incumbent Sherrod Brown by a 6-point margin.  He also ran unsuccessfully in the 2022 Republican primary for governor of Ohio, losing to incumbent Mike DeWine. Renacci currently serves as the chairman of the Republican Party of Medina County.

Early life and education
James Renacci was born December 3, 1958, in Monongahela, Pennsylvania, the son of Anna Marie (Sasko), a nurse, and Evo Renacci, a railroad worker. Renacci earned a degree in business administration from Indiana University of Pennsylvania and became a Certified Public Accountant and financial advisor.

Business career
In 2003, Renacci formed the LTC Companies group, a financial consulting service that had partial ownership of three Harley-Davidson dealerships in Columbus, the Lifestyle Communities Pavilion in Columbus, and Renacci-Doraty Chevrolet in Wadsworth.

Renacci has been involved with real estate, automobile dealerships, nursing homes, and other businesses. He has made use of the legal system during his business career, including initiating legal proceedings against former business partners, companies, and the state of Ohio. He has also been sued, including for the wrongful death of a patient in one of the nursing homes he owns. That case was settled out of court.

Renacci was a partner and managing board member of the former Arena Football League's Columbus Destroyers. 

Renacci also served as AFL Executive Committee Vice Chairman and is a partial owner of the Lancaster JetHawks, a minor league baseball team.

U.S. House of Representatives

Elections
2010

Renacci announced on August 24, 2009, that he would run for the U.S. House of Representatives in Ohio's 16th district, officially filing on January 11, 2010. Renacci ran as a "Contender" of the National Republican Congressional Committee in its "Young Guns" program. Renacci defeated Democratic incumbent John Boccieri by 52% to 41% with 7% of the vote going to Libertarian candidate Jeffrey Blevins.

2012

The Plain Dealer reported in September 2011 that the new district map of Ohio would place Representative Betty Sutton in "a Republican leaning district that's being constructed to favor Renacci." In December, Sutton filed to run against Renacci. Later that month, Roll Call reported that a poll taken at least two months earlier showed the two candidates "neck and neck at 45 percent." The race was included on the [[Washington Post|Washington Post'''s]] list of top 10 House races to watch in 2012. Renacci defeated Sutton by a 52% to 48% margin on election day.

In 2012, the Federal Bureau of Investigation investigated campaign contributions made by employees of an Ohio-based direct marketing corporation, Suarez Corporation Industries, to the campaigns of Renacci and Josh Mandel. Renacci's campaign returned all of the donations. The owner of the company was later only found guilty of witness tampering in the case and served time in prison.

Tenure
Renacci was ranked the 46th most bipartisan member of the U.S. House of Representatives during the 114th United States Congress (and the third most bipartisan member of the U.S. House of Representatives from Ohio) in the Bipartisan Index created by The Lugar Center and the McCourt School of Public Policy that ranks members of the United States Congress by their degree of bipartisanship (by measuring the frequency each member's bills attract co-sponsors from the opposite party and each member's co-sponsorship of bills by members of the opposite party).

He is a member of the Republican Study Committee and Republican Main Street Partnership.

LGBT Rights
In 2015, Renacci was amongst 60 Republicans voting to uphold President Barack Obama’s 2014 executive order banning federal contractors from making hiring decisions that discriminate based on sexual orientation or gender identity.

In 2016, Renacci was among 43 Republicans to vote for the Maloney Amendment to H.R. 5055 which would prohibit the use of funds for government contractors who discriminate against LGBT employees.

Committee assignments
 House Ways and Means Committee
 Subcommittee on Tax Policy
 Subcommittee on Social Security
United States House Budget Committee

In the 112th Congress, Renacci served on the Committee on Financial Services, as vice chair of the Subcommittee on Financial Institutions and Consumer Credit, and a member of the Subcommittee on Oversight and Investigations.

Caucus memberships
Renacci has been a member of the following caucuses:
 Republican Study Committee
Congressional Coal Caucus
 Congressional Steel Caucus
Congressional CPA Caucus
 NorthEast-MidWest Coalition
 General Aviation Caucus
 Hydrogen & Fuel Cell Caucus
 Congressional Academic Medicine Caucus (113th Congress)

2018 election campaigns
Gubernatorial

In January 2017, several news outlets reported that Renacci was considering running for Governor of Ohio in 2018. Politico reported that "as a wealthy auto dealer prior to being elected to Congress, Renacci would potentially be able to self-fund a statewide bid." On March 21, 2017, Renacci announced his intention to run for the Republican nomination for governor of Ohio in 2018. He dropped out of the governor's race in January 2018 in order to run for U.S. Senate.

U.S. Senate

In January 2018, Renacci announced his candidacy for the U.S. Senate. On May 8, 2018, he won the Republican primary, becoming the Republican nominee for the U.S. Senate from Ohio. In his campaign, Renacci was endorsed by President Donald Trump and Vice President Mike Pence.

In 2018, he was ranked Ohio's wealthiest Congress member.  In 2018, he was endorsed by Donald Trump in his race for Brown's seat in Senate. During debates with Sherrod Brown, a debate at WOSU-TV studios in Columbus was almost cancelled after "last-minute arguing between the two sides, fueled by Renacci's recent escalation of personal attacks against Brown."

In March 2018, the Associated Press reported that as a registered lobbyist, Renacci had failed to report $50,000 in political contributions he had been given from 2008 to 2010. Renacci's campaign, in response, said he never lobbied, and had only been registered as a lobbyist with a consulting firm, Smokerise International Group, he helped found in 2008 as a "precautionary measure." Although Renacci's lawyer provided paperwork to journalists showing he had been listed as "inactive" as a lobbyist in 2009, the Associated Press found Renacci's lobbyist registration was deactivated in May 2011, the year when the paperwork was filed, and four months after he entered Congress.

In October 2018, he defended flying on the plane of a strip club owner to meet with religious figures, staying "He's a volunteer who... I met during the campaign. He asked to volunteer for me. I'm not going to vet volunteers, and I'm not going to vet the press's looking at volunteers." At the time, press and Ohio Republicans noted that since the May primary, Renacci had spent half a million on advertising, while Brown had spent $12.5 million, and "some Ohio Republicans have questioned whether Renacci's lack of advertising reflects his unwillingness to spend his own money on his race. Renacci has loaned his campaign $4 million of his own money, which represent[ed] the majority of his campaign fundraising."

Renacci was defeated by incumbent Democratic U.S. Senator Sherrod Brown in the November 6, 2018, general election. Brown received 53% of the vote, while Renacci received 47%.

Post-congressional career
As of 2019, Renacci is the Chairman of Ohio's Future Foundation, which he founded after losing the 2018 U.S. Senate election to Brown.

On June 25, 2020, Renacci announced that he had been drafted to serve as the Chairman of the Medina County GOP.

 2022 Ohio gubernatorial campaign 

Renacci wrote op-eds criticizing Ohio governor Mike DeWine.  In May 2021, NBC News reported that Brad Parscale was offering unpaid support to Renacci in considering a gubernatorial bid. In a tweet criticizing Governor Mike DeWine in June 2021, WKYC hinted Renacci might enter the race for governor in 2022. He launched a primary campaign officially later on June 9, 2021. He stated in an interview, "Ohio cannot afford for Mike DeWine to be the governor anymore. My path may have been diverted in 2018 but my will really to change Ohio was not." He said he wouldn't have hired Amy Acton, Ohio Department of Health director, saying her announcement of early predictions about COVID-19 had been a "scare tactic. That scared people." With his gubernatorial bid advised by Brad Parscale, Renacci also stated "Trump is still a friend. I think in the end if I get an opportunity to talk with him, which I'm hoping to be able to do that, he'll see that Jim Renacci has a really good opportunity." Although he had stated his support for Trump, by June 22, 2021, Trump hadn't endorsed a candidate in the Ohio Senate or gubernatorial races. Alongside Parscale, Renacci brought in "numerous" other former Trump staffers to his campaign, according to The Gazette. Renacci lost the Republican primary election to incumbent Governor Mike DeWine garnering 28% percent of the vote compared to DeWine's 48%.

Personal life
In 2012, The Christian Science Monitor'' included Renacci in its list of the 10 richest members of Congress, estimating his net worth at $36.67 million.

In 2017, Renacci's net worth was estimated at $83.32 million.

In June 2016, the Ohio Supreme Court unanimously ruled that the state of Ohio must refund $359,822 that Renacci and his wife had paid in penalties in a dispute over their 2000 taxes. The court's opinion stated that the Ohio tax commissioner had abused his discretion by penalizing the Renaccis because the couple had reasonably believed they did not owe taxes on profits from an entity that the state later determined was subject to taxation. The Renaccis had relied on an earlier legal interpretation in delaying tax payments.

Electoral history

References

External links

 
 

|-

|-

1958 births
21st-century American politicians
American accountants
American people of Hungarian descent
American people of Italian descent
Arena Football League executives
Businesspeople from Ohio
Candidates in the 2018 United States Senate elections
Columbus Destroyers
Indiana University of Pennsylvania alumni
Living people
Mayors of places in Ohio
People from Monongahela, Pennsylvania
People from Wadsworth, Ohio
Republican Party members of the United States House of Representatives from Ohio